Washington, D.C., has major league sports teams, popular college sports teams, and a variety of other team and individual sports. The Washington metropolitan area is also home to several major sports venues including Capital One Arena, RFK Stadium, FedExField, Audi Field, and Nationals Park.

The NFL's Washington Commanders were among the most successful professional sports teams in North America throughout the 1980s and early 1990s, making four Super Bowl appearances and winning three in a ten-year period ending in 1992. The sports of this region would then fall into a period of irrelevance; after the NHL's Washington Capitals reached the 1998 Stanley Cup Finals, none of the "Big Four" teams in the area (the Commanders, the Capitals, the NBA's Washington Wizards and MLB's Washington Nationals) would reach its sport's conference championship round for several years. The Commanders and Wizards often struggled in their respective regular seasons, while the Capitals and Nationals were known for having spectacular regular seasons followed by demoralizing playoff losses. (However, D.C. United of Major League Soccer would win several league championships during the late 1990s and early 2000s.)

In 2018, the Big Four drought was broken when the Capitals defeated the Vegas Golden Knights in the 2018 Stanley Cup Finals. The following year, the Nationals defeated the Houston Astros in the 2019 World Series. Outside of the Big Four, the Washington Valor defeated the Baltimore Brigade to win ArenaBowl XXXI in July 2018, and the Washington Mystics defeated the Connecticut Sun in the 2019 WNBA Finals barely a month before the Nationals won their title, giving the Washington area four first-time champions in under two years.

Popular collegiate teams include the Georgetown Hoyas and Maryland Terrapins; both schools have each won an NCAA Division I men's basketball championship (Georgetown in 1984, Maryland in 2002). The region is also home to two regional sports television networks: NBC Sports Washington, based in Bethesda, Maryland, and Mid-Atlantic Sports Network, based in Baltimore.

In 2018, it was announced that Paul Sheehy, owner and director of used operations for Sheehy Auto Stores, and Chris Dunlavey, president and co-founder of Brailsford & Dunlavey, have secured the right to launch a D.C.-based Major League Rugby team, named Old Glory DC. The Scottish Rugby Union has a part ownership of the team. The team is coached by Nate Osborne in an interim capacity after former head coach Andrew Douglas departed the club halfway through the 2022 season. Old Glory played an abbreviated schedule of exhibition games in 2019 and began regular-season MLR play in 2020.

Professional sports
The following table shows the major league sports teams in the Washington area, sorted primarily by attendance in the most recent season for which data is available.

Map of major league teams and sports stadiums in Washington, D.C.

Soccer

Washington is home to an original Major League Soccer club, D.C. United, which began play at RFK Stadium in 1996. One of the most successful MLS teams (with twelve major trophies, won domestically and at an international level), United has won four MLS Cups, including three of the first four played. They also won the U.S. Open Cup in their first year, in 2008, and again in 2013. In addition, United have captured four MLS Supporters Shields, the most out of any MLS club in the region. D.C. United's 1997 MLS Cup victory at RFK Stadium was the only time a Washington team has won a championship within the District. United moved to their new home, Audi Field, in 2018.

The region hosts a top-level women's soccer team, the Washington Spirit. The team had historically played at the Maryland SoccerPlex, but in 2019 moved select games to Audi Field. In 2020, the Spirit will transition away from the SoccerPlex, playing four home games at each of three venues—the SoccerPlex, Audi Field, and Segra Field in Leesburg, Virginia. Then in 2021, the team will leave the SoccerPlex entirely, splitting home games between Audi Field and Segra Field. The team is one of the eight charter members of the National Women's Soccer League, a professional league launched by the United States Soccer Federation in 2013.

Since 2019, the area has been represented in the second tier of U.S. men's soccer, the USL Championship, by Loudoun United FC, owned and operated by D.C. United as their official reserve side. Loudoun United started play at Audi Field, moving to their permanent home of Segra Field during their first season.

RFK Stadium has hosted two more MLS Cup championships. In 2000, the Kansas City Wizards (now known as Sporting Kansas City) won their first championship with a 1–0 win over the Chicago Fire. In the 2007 MLS Cup, the Houston Dynamo defeated the New England Revolution 2–1. RFK Memorial Stadium also served as a soccer venue in the 1994 FIFA World Cup and the 1996 Summer Olympics. FedExField has also hosted several prominent soccer games, including six matches in the 1999 FIFA Women's World Cup. In July 2011, a match between Manchester United and Barcelona at FedExField drew a crowd of 81,807, a record soccer attendance for the D.C. metropolitan area.

American football

The Washington Commanders (formerly the Washington Redskins) are the seventh-most valuable franchise in the NFL, according to Forbes magazine. The football team is historically the most popular sports team in the area and plays in one of the largest stadiums in the National Football League, FedExField, located in the Washington suburb of Landover, Maryland. In its first season in Washington after relocating from Boston in 1937, the Redskins won the NFL championship. They won again in 1942 and later played in five Super Bowls, winning three times (1982, 1987, and 1991).

The DC Defenders of the XFL began play at Audi Field in February 2020.

Baseball

Washington's first professional baseball team was the Washington Olympics who played in 1871 and 1872. Several more teams played in the 19th century including the first incarnation of the Washington Senators (1891–99). A different Washington Senators team began play in 1901. The Senators played most of their home games at Griffith Stadium and won the 1924 World Series and three American League pennants.

The ceremonial first pitch got its start in D.C. in 1910 when President William Howard Taft threw out the first pitch at the Senators' Opening Day game. Every president since Taft has thrown out the first pitch in at least one important game, usually in Washington, D.C. (when D.C. has had a Major League team).

Several Negro league baseball teams played in Washington including the Black Senators and the Elite Giants. The longest lasting was the Homestead Grays. Though officially being based outside Pittsburgh, the Grays played a number of home games at their "home away from home", Griffith Stadium in Washington. The Grays won the Negro League World Series in 1943, 1944, and 1948.

The Senators moved away in 1960 and became the Minnesota Twins. This team was replaced next season by a new Senators team which played Griffith Stadium in 1961 and then at D.C. Stadium (later, RFK Stadium) in 1962 until 1971 when it was relocated and became the Texas Rangers.

Washington was then without a professional baseball team for over three decades until Major League Baseball relocated the Montreal Expos to the city for the 2005 season. In the interim, the Baltimore Orioles served as Washington's home team. Orioles ownership marketed the team heavily to Washington baseball fans, even removing "Baltimore" from the team's uniform (however, since the return of baseball to the D.C. area, Baltimore is now on the uniform). The Orioles' reliance on the Washington market became a hindrance to Washington's efforts to gain their own baseball team as Orioles ownership lobbied Major League Baseball to keep a professional team out of Washington. Eventually, baseball's owners, burdened with a poorly performing Montreal franchise, were convinced to move the team to Washington with the promise of a brand new stadium fully financed by the D.C. government. Orioles' owner Peter Angelos cast the lone dissenting vote in the 28–1 decision. After spending their first three seasons at RFK Stadium, the Nationals began playing at Nationals Park in 2008. The Nationals would eventually win their first-ever World Series pennant in 2019, beating the Houston Astros.

Basketball

Washington's first professional basketball team was the Washington Capitols who played in the inaugural season of the Basketball Association of America (precursor to the National Basketball Association) at Uline Arena. That first year, the Capitols had a .817 winning percentage including a 17-game winning streak. The team began the 1948–49 season with a 15-game winning streak. The Capitols folded on January 9, 1951.

An ABA team, the Washington Caps, played one season at Uline Arena (then known as Washington Coliseum) in 1969–70 and finished with a 44–40 record. The following year the team moved south and became the Virginia Squires.

On December 2, 1973, the NBA's Baltimore Bullets played their first home game at the newly built Capital Centre in Landover, Maryland and became the Washington Bullets. Despite the name change, the team continued to play many of their home games in Baltimore at the Baltimore Civic Center. The Bullets went to the NBA Finals in 1975 where they were swept in four games by the Golden State Warriors.

The Bullets' next appearance in the NBA Finals happened in 1978 when they beat the heavily favored Seattle SuperSonics in seven games. To date, this is the franchise's only league title. The two teams met again in the 1979 NBA Finals, with the Sonics winning 4 games to 1.

In 1995, team owner Abe Pollin announced the Bullets would change their name out of sensitivity to the high rate of gun violence in Washington, D.C. Following a fan vote, the team became known as the Washington Wizards on May 15, 1997. Later that year, the Wizards moved into D.C. to play in the newly constructed MCI Center, now known as Capital One Arena. This new arena was constructed by Pollin. The Wizards have recently turned around a culture of losing, winning their first playoff series in 23 years in 2005 and making the playoffs the next four years under the leadership of star point guard, Gilbert Arenas.

The new MCI Center soon became the home court for an expansion Women's National Basketball Association team, the Washington Mystics. Despite having only two winning seasons and a mere four playoff wins, the Mystics excelled in another way by leading the league in attendance from 1998 through 2000 and 2002 through 2004. The team hung six banners in the Verizon Center touting themselves as "Attendance Champions". These banners were frequently criticized and in 2010 the new owner of the team and arena, Ted Leonsis, ordered them removed.

Following the departure of star players like Arenas, Antawn Jamison, and Caron Butler, the Wizards finished with the 5th worst record in the 2009-10 NBA season. The team subsequently won the 2010 Draft Lottery and selected Kentucky point guard John Wall with the first pick, whom new owner Ted Leonsis and team president Ernie Grunfeld would build the team around in the years to come.

The 2018–19 season marked the debut of the Capital City Go-Go, a team owned by the Wizards that plays in the NBA's official minor league, the NBA G League. The Go-Go play at St. Elizabeths East Entertainment and Sports Arena (ESA), a venue in the Congress Heights neighborhood of southeast Washington that opened in 2018. This arena also serves as the Wizards' practice facility, and in 2019 also became the full-time home of the Mystics. The Mystics' first season in the ESA saw the team claim its first WNBA title, with Elena Delle Donne being named season MVP on the strength of the first 50–40–90 season in league history and Emma Meesseman earning Finals MVP honors.

Ice hockey

In the mid 20th century, the Washington Lions played in the American Hockey League and other leagues at the Uline Ice Arena. 
Starting with the National Hockey League's 1974 expansion, the Capitals have been Washington's professional hockey team. That first season the Capitals only won eight games earning an NHL-record low .131 winning percentage. After spending their first 23 seasons playing in the Capital Centre in Landover, Maryland, the Caps moved into D.C. to play in the newly constructed Capital One Arena (then known as the MCI Center) in 1997. A competitive high point came in their first season in the new arena when they defeated the Buffalo Sabres in the Eastern Conference Finals, earning a trip to the Stanley Cup Finals where they were swept in four games by the Detroit Red Wings. 

Among the many seasons of disappointing playoff exits from 2008 to 2017, a new story was written when Evgeny Kuznetsov lifted the Capitals over the Pittsburgh Penguins in OT of Game 6 in the second round of the 2018 Stanley Cup playoffs to advance to the Eastern Conference Finals for the first time in 20 years. Led by Alexander Ovechkin, the Capitals went on to defeat the Tampa Bay Lightning in seven games to claim the title as 2017–18 Eastern Conference champions, the second title in franchise history. On June 7, 2018, the Capitals defeated the Vegas Golden Knights in five games to win their first Stanley Cup in franchise history.

In addition to their two Eastern Conference Championships, the Capitals have won three Presidents' Trophies and claimed 13 division titles. The team won four straight division championships as members of the Southeast Division between the 2007 and 2010 seasons, and five straight in the current Metropolitan Division since 2015. Four Capitals players have been inducted into the Hockey Hall of Fame: Mike Gartner, Rod Langway, Larry Murphy, and Scott Stevens.

Rugby union
The Washington, D.C. area is home to numerous rugby union teams, including men's, women's, college and high school. Prominent club teams include the Potomac Athletic Club, Washington Rugby Football Club, Washington Irish R.F.C.,and the Maryland Exiles. These two clubs merged in 2014 as the Potomac Exiles Rugby Club The Maryland Terrapins rugby team plays in the Atlantic Coast Rugby League against its traditional ACC rivals. At the high school level, Gonzaga fields one of the strongest programs in the country, and Pride rugby (formerly Hyde rugby) gained national attention as the first rugby program at a predominantly African-American school.

Old Glory DC is a professional rugby union team that is a member of Major League Rugby (MLR), founded in 2018. The organization is led by two local business leaders, former USA Eagles' Paul Sheehy and local club rugby player Chris Dunlavey. The Scottish Rugby Union has a part ownership of the team. The team is coached by Nate Osborne in an interim capacity after former head coach Andrew Douglas departed the club halfway through the 2022 season. Old Glory played an abbreviated schedule of exhibition games in 2019 and began regular-season MLR play in 2020.

Former teams
Washington's team in the North American Soccer League, the Washington Diplomats, played at RFK from 1974 to 1981, with a record attendance of 53,351 in a match against the N.Y. Cosmos in 1980. Washington also had the Washington Whips, Washington Darts, and Team America in the NASL.

The Washington Freedom Women's Professional Soccer (WPS) team moved to Boca Raton, Florida in 2011. The team began as the Freedom in the now-defunct Women's United Soccer Association (WUSA). The Freedom played at RFK for the three years of the league's existence and won the league championship in 2003, the WUSA's final year. Following the WUSA's demise, the team continued as an associate member of the W-League playing their home games at the Maryland SoccerPlex in Germantown.

Collegiate sports
The following schools are located in the Washington, D.C. metropolitan area:

On December 20, 2008, Washington hosted its first college bowl game, the EagleBank Bowl, at RFK Stadium. The first match-up saw Wake Forest defeat Navy, 29–19. After the sponsorship deal between the bowl organizers and EagleBank expired following the 2009 edition, the game was renamed the Military Bowl, thanks to a new sponsorship deal with a major defense contractor. The game left the Washington metropolitan area after its 2012 edition; it has since been played at Navy–Marine Corps Memorial Stadium in Annapolis, Maryland, which lies within the Baltimore metropolitan area.

Georgetown basketball
Georgetown University began fielding a basketball team in 1907. The Georgetown Hoyas have won eight Big East tournament championships and ten Big East regular season championships. They have appeared the NCAA Final Four five times, winning the national championship in 1984.
Several NBA players got their start playing for Georgetown including Patrick Ewing, Allen Iverson, Alonzo Mourning, Dikembe Mutombo, and Reggie Williams. The Hoyas play their home games at Capital One Arena.

Other sports

Flag football
Washington, D.C. is home to 22 teams flag football teams that play under the DC Gay Flag Football League which is part of the National Gay Flag Football League. In 1994, the DC League formed as an organized unit. The DCGFFL won the Gay Bowl in 2003 and 2004. In September 2010, DCGFFL premiered in its first season as an official league as part of the NGFFL. Washington, D.C. hosted the Gay Bowl in 2016 on the National Mall.

Lacrosse
Fairfax, Virginia in the Washington suburbs was home to the Washington Bayhawks of Major League Lacrosse. The Bayhawks moved to George Mason Stadium, after playing one season at Georgetown University and six seasons in Baltimore. The Bayhawks are one of Major League Lacrosse's original six teams, created in 2001 the same year the league started. The Bayhawks have twice won championships in the MLL in 2002 and 2005. The Bayhawks began playing their home games at Navy–Marine Corps Memorial Stadium in Annapolis, Maryland, which is in the federally defined Baltimore Metropolitan Area, for the 2009 season and changed their name to the Chesapeake Bayhawks in 2010. The Washington Power were a member of the National Lacrosse League during the 2001 and 2002 seasons. After the inaugural championship in 1987 in Baltimore (as the Thunder) through 1999 and an unsuccessful stint in Pittsburgh (as the CrosseFire), the franchise moved to Washington, D.C. in 2001. After two seasons of low attendance in Washington, the franchise moved, this time to Denver, Colorado, as the Colorado Mammoth. In Colorado they have seen success both on and off the field, culminating in 2006, when they had the highest attendance in the league, and also won the Champion's Cup.

Rugby league
The Washington, D.C. Slayers rugby league team who play in the USARL play their home games at Duke Ellington Field, 38th St NW and R St NW. The other rugby league team in the Washington, D.C. area, the Northern Virginia Eagles, play in Fairfax County, Virginia.

Running
Washington is home to two annual marathon races: the Marine Corps Marathon which is held every autumn and the Rock 'n' Roll USA Marathon held in the spring. The Marine Corps Marathon begun in 1976 is sometimes called "The People's Marathon" because it is the largest marathon without prize money. The Cherry Blossom 10-Mile Run is another annual race that began in 1973 and is conducted as part of the National Cherry Blossom Festival. The Army Ten-Miler, started in 1985, is the country's largest ten-mile race with over 26,000 participants; it is held each October and its course runs through Washington, D.C. and finishes at the Pentagon.

Tennis
Washington hosts an annual joint ATP Tour men's tennis and WTA Tour women's tennis event, the  Washington Open at the William H.G. FitzGerald Tennis Center in Rock Creek Park. It is an ATP 500 event and WTA 250, and serves as a popular tune-up tournament prior to the  US Open.

In July 2008, the Washington Kastles, a World TeamTennis team, played their first season in a temporary stadium in downtown Washington, D.C. finishing with a 6–8 record. In 2009, despite losing their first four matches, the Kastles won the WTT championship. The Kastles were 8–6 and just missed the playoffs in 2010. In 2011, the Kastles moved to Kastles Stadium at the Wharf at 800 Water Street, SW in Washington right off Maine Avenue. The Kastles played the 2011, 2012 and 2013 seasons there. In 2011, the Kastles posted a perfect season of 16–0 and won the WTT Championship. The 2011 season was the 36th for World Team Tennis, and the Kastles became the first team to accomplish the feat of a perfect season. They posted a second perfect season of 16–0 in 2012, and won another WTT Championship, becoming the only professional sports team to have back-to-back undefeated seasons. In 2013, the Kastles won their first match of the season to post a record of 33 straight wins, equaling the 33 games winning streak of the 1971–72 Los Angeles Lakers of the NBA. The Kastles won the second match of the season to set a new record of 34 straight wins by a top-tier professional sports team. Even though the Kastles lost the third and fourth matches of the 2013 season, they went undefeated for the remainder of the season to finish with a 14–2 record and won their third consecutive WTT Championship. In 2014, the Kastles moved to Kastles Stadium at the Charles E. Smith Center on the campus of George Washington University and won their fourth consecutive WTT Championship with an overall record of 12–4. In the first seven years of the franchise, the Kastles have won five WTT titles.

Rivalries

New York City

The rivalries between the sports teams in New York City and Washington, D.C. have been among the best and most historic in the country. Each city's importance in America's media landscape has helped increase the notoriety of these rivalries, as has the fact that many teams in each city play in the same division.

The rivalry with the longest history between teams in each city is the rivalry between the New York Giants and the Washington Commanders in the National Football League (NFL). Both teams play in the Eastern division of the National Football Conference (known as the NFC East). The two teams therefore play against each other twice every regular season. Both teams are among the oldest and most successful in professional football, with the rivalry dating back to 1932. This matchup has included some of the game's greatest players and coaches throughout the decades.

In the National Hockey League (NHL), strong rivalries exists between the Washington Capitals and the New York Rangers, as well as the Capitals and the New York Islanders. All three compete in the Metropolitan Division of the Eastern Conference. Both the Capitals-Rangers rivalry and Capitals-Islanders rivalry have increased in intensity over the decades as a result of highly competitive playoff matchups, in addition to regular season encounters. Though not as historic and intense as the ones with the two New York-based teams, the New Jersey Devils also play in the Metropolitan Division and are therefore a division rival for the Capitals.

There is also a rivalry between the New York Red Bulls and D.C. United of Major League Soccer (MLS). The teams are among the oldest and most historic teams in the league. This rivalry dates back to 1996, the league's inaugural season. Both teams play in the Eastern Conference and have competed against each other in critical playoff matches over the years. Their rivalry is known as the Atlantic Cup, which is also the name of the trophy awarded to the team that wins the matchup.

The Washington Nationals and New York Mets of Major League Baseball (MLB) also share a rivalry. Though this rivalry has not existed for as long as the others between teams based in New York and Washington, the two compete in the National League East division. This has helped a rivalry develop between the two teams in the years since the Nationals moved to Washington, D.C. in 2005.

Philadelphia

The rivalry between teams in Philadelphia and Washington, D.C. has been aided by the fact that the two cities have teams in the same division in the NFL, NHL, MLB, and MLS. 

The Philadelphia Eagles and the Washington Commanders of the NFL have a long and historic rivalry, having (almost always) competed in the same division since 1933. Currently, both teams play in the NFC East and therefore play each other twice every regular season.

The Philadelphia Flyers and the Washington Capitals of the NHL both played in the Patrick Division during the 1980s and early 1990s, during which time the rivalry was extremely intense. Since 2013, both play in the Metropolitan Division of the Eastern Conference. The Capitals-Flyers rivalry has been intense both during the regular season as well as during the playoffs. The teams have met five times in the NHL playoffs. This rivalry dates back to 1974, when the Capitals joined the league.

Since the Nationals moved to Washington, D.C. in 2005, they have had a rivalry with the Philadelphia Phillies, as both compete in the NL East of the MLB. The Philadelphia Union of the MLS have developed an intraconference rivalry with D.C. United. The Washington Wizards and the Philadelphia 76ers both play in the NBA's Eastern Conference, and the two teams met in the NBA playoffs five times, most recently in 2021. They also met in 1971, when the current Washington franchise was based in Baltimore.

Baltimore

Due to the two cities' proximity to one another, historic and contemporary rivalries have existed between teams from both cities. 

From 1972 to 2004, Washington did not have a baseball team; as a result, many baseball fans in the Washington area supported the nearby Baltimore Orioles, making them the de facto baseball team for Washington. When Washington was looking for a team, the ownership of the Orioles disapproved of the effort for fear that they would lose the Washington market to the new team. They were the only team to vote against moving the Montreal Expos to Washington. Therefore, when the Nationals began play in 2005, a natural rivalry was born between the new Washington team and the team that had historic support in the Washington region. This rivalry is known as the Beltway Series due to each city's proximity to the Capital Beltway, a major ring road that circles around Washington and its immediate suburbs. Given that the two teams play in different leagues (the Nationals play in the National League and the Orioles play in the American League), it is a rare interleague rivalry.

The Commanders and Baltimore Ravens of the NFL have a slight rivalry. Though because the two teams play in different conferences (the Commanders play in the National Football Conference (NFC) and the Ravens play in the American Football Conference (AFC)), they rarely play against each other.

See also
Washington DC Sports Hall of Fame
District of Columbia Interscholastic Athletic Association
U.S. cities with teams from four major sports

Notes

External links

D.C. Sports and Entertainment Commission
Greater Washington Sports Alliance